The Collingwood Blues are a junior ice hockey team based in Collingwood, Ontario.  They play in the Ontario Junior Hockey League.

History 
At the end of the 2018–19 season the Kingston Voyageurs was sold to Dave Steele, manager of the Stayner Siskins. The team was eventually moved to Collingwood and named the Collingwood Colts, ending 43 years of Vees hockey. Their home arena is the Eddie Bush Memorial Arena in Collingwood, Ontario. 

The Collingwood Colts are the main affiliate for the Barrie Colts of the Ontario Hockey League

At the conclusion of the 2019-20 season, the team was rebranded the Collingwood Blues.

Season-by-season results

Staff 

 Owner – Dave Steele
 General Manager – Michael Tarantino
 Head Coach – Andrew Campoli

Notable alumni 

 Scott Arniel – (Buffalo Sabres)
 Daniel Cleary – (Detroit Red Wings) – (Stanley Cup Champion 2008)
 Brandon Convery – (Toronto Maple Leafs)
 Doug Gilmour – (Calgary Flames) –  (Stanley Cup Champion 1989)
 Ryan Hamilton - (Edmonton Oilers)
 Todd MacDonald – (Florida Panthers)
 Alyn McCauley – (Los Angeles Kings)
 Jay McClement – (St. Louis Blues)
 Jay McKee - (Buffalo Sabres)
 Marc Moro – (Toronto Maple Leafs)
 Kirk Muller – (Montreal Canadiens) – (Stanley Cup Champion 1993)
 Mike Murphy - (Carolina Hurricanes)
 Steve Seguin - (Los Angeles Kings)
 Mike Smith – (Phoenix Coyotes)
 Nate Robinson – (Boston Bruins)
 Rik Wilson – (St. Louis Blues)
 Bob Wren – (Toronto Maple Leafs)

 Patrick Ashton – (EV Landsberg)
 Jeff Foster – (Milwaukee Admirals)
 Brett Gibson – (Pensacola Ice Pilots)
 Tim Keyes – (Syracuse Crunch)
 Adam McAllister – (Tulsa Oilers)
 Christoffer Kjærgaard – Danish national team
 Scott Harrington – (Toronto Marlies)
 Francesco Vilardi – (Flint Firebirds)

References

External links 
 
 OJHL League Website

Ontario Provincial Junior A Hockey League teams
1974 establishments in Ontario
Ice hockey clubs established in 1974
